Li Hanhua (born 26 February 1982) is a Chinese swimmer. He won a gold medal at the Mixed 4x50metre freestyle relay-20 Points event at the 2016 Summer Paralympics, where he swam in the heats (with a time of 42.35)  but not in the final race, where the team won with 2:18.03, a world record and paralympic record. He also won a bronze medal at the Men's 50 metre Freestyle S3 event with 42.18 and another bronze medal at the Men's 100 metre freestyle S3 event with 3:23.10.

References

External links 
 
 Li Hanhua – Glasgow 2015 IPC Swimming World Championships at the International Paralympic Committee

1982 births
Living people
Chinese male freestyle swimmers
S3-classified Paralympic swimmers
Paralympic swimmers of China
Paralympic medalists in swimming
Paralympic gold medalists for China
Paralympic bronze medalists for China
Swimmers at the 2016 Summer Paralympics
Medalists at the 2016 Summer Paralympics
Medalists at the World Para Swimming Championships
21st-century Chinese people
20th-century Chinese people